Maalem Synagogue is a synagogue located on the slopes overlooking the Golden Horn near the Jewish old age home in the Hasköy district of Istanbul, Turkey. It is the only remaining open synagogue in an area that once had many Jewish residents. The synagogue is open for visits only during weekdays. Shabbat services are held regularly.

See also
 History of the Jews in Turkey
 List of synagogues in Turkey

References and notes

External links
 Chief Rabbinate of Turkey
 Shalom Newspaper - The main Jewish newspaper in Turkey

Synagogues in Istanbul
Golden Horn
Beyoğlu